This is a list of medical schools located in People's Republic of China, excepting the pure traditional Chinese medicine colleges or universities but including the ones which could confer the MBBS and the Medical Schools that are WHO approved.

For the TCM schools, see List of traditional Chinese medicine schools in China

Anhui
 Anhui Medical University
 School of Medicine, Anhui University of Science and Technology
 Bengbu Medical College
 Wannan Medical College

Beijing
 Beijing University of Chinese Medicine
 Capital Medical University
 Peking Union Medical College
 Peking University Health Science Center, Peking University
 Tsinghua University

Chengdu 

 Chengdu Medical College
 West China Medical College, Sichuan University

Chongqing
 Chongqing Medical University

Fujian
 Fujian Medical University
 Faculty of Medicine, Fujian University of Traditional Chinese Medicine
 School of Clinical Medicine, Putian University
 Medical College, Xiamen University

Gansu
 Gansu Medical College
 School of Clinical Medicine, Gansu University of traditional Chinese Medicine
 School of Medicine, Hexi University
 School of Medicine, Lanzhou University
 Northwest University for Nationalities

Guangdong
 Guangdong Medical University
 Guangdong Pharmaceutical University
 Guangzhou Medical University
 School of Medicine, South China University of Technology, Guangzhou
 Guangzhou University of Traditional Chinese Medicine
 Medical College, Jiaying University
 School of Medicine, Jinan University, Guangzhou
 Medical College, Shaoguan University
 Medical College, Shantou University
 Health Science Center, Shenzhen University
 School of Medicine, Southern University of Science and Technology, Shenzhen
 Southern Medical University, Guangzhou
 Zhongshan School of Medicine, Sun Yat-sen University, Guangzhou

Guangxi
 Guangxi Medical University
 Guangxi University Of Chinese Medicine
 Guilin Medical College
 Youjiang Medical University for Nationalities

Guizhou 
 Guizhou Medical University
 Zunyi Medical University

Hainan
 Hainan Medical College

Hebei 
 Chengde Medical University
 Hebei North University
 Hebei Medical University
 Medical College, Hebei University
 Faculty of Medicine, Hebei University of Engineering
 School of Clinical Medicine, North China University of Science and Technology

Heilongjiang
 Harbin Medical University
 School of Clinical Medicine, Jiamusi University
 Qiqihar Medical University
 Heilongjiang University of Chinese Medicine
 Mudanjiang Medical University

Henan
 Faculty of Medicine, Henan University
 Medical College, Henan University of Science and Technology
 Xinxiang Medical University
 Faculty of Clinical Medicine, Zhengzhou University

Hong Kong

 The Chinese University of Hong Kong, Faculty of Medicine
 Li Ka Shing Faculty of Medicine, The University of Hong Kong 
 Hong Kong Baptist University

Hubei
 Medical College, China Three Gorges University
 Tongji Medical College, Huazhong University of Science and Technology
 Hubei University of Chinese Medicine
 Hubei University of Medicine
 School of Clinical Medicine, Hubei University of Science and Technology
 School of Medicine, Jianghan University
 Medical Research Institute, Wuhan University
 School of Medicine, Wuhan University of Science and Technology
 Medical School, Yangtze University
 Hubei polytechnic university, 
 Hubei University of Arts & Science

Hunan
 Xiangya School of Medicine, Central South University
 Changsha Medical University
 School of Clinical Medicine, Hunan University of Chinese Medicine
 Hunan University of Medicine
 School of Medicine, Jishou University
 School of Medicine, University of South China
 School of Clinical Medicine, Xiangnan University

Inner Mongolia 
 Baotou Medical College
 Inner Mongolia Medical University
 Chifeng university

Jiangsu
 Wuxi Medical School, Jiangnan University
 School of Medicine, Jiangsu University
 Nanjing Medical University
 School of Medicine, Nanjing University
 Faculty of Medicine, Nanjing University of Chinese Medicine
 Medicine School, Nantong University
 Medical College, Soochow University
 School of Medicine, Southeast University
 Xuzhou Medical University
 School of Medicine, Yangzhou University

Jiangxi
 Gannan Medical University
 Faculty of Medicine, Jinggangshan University
 Faculty of Medicine, Jiujiang University
 Jiangxi University Of Traditional Chinese Medicine
 Jiangxi Medical College/ Faculty of Medicine & Fuzhou Medical College, Nanchang University
 School of Medicine & School of Cosmetology, Yichun University

Jilin
 Faculty of Medicine, Beihua University
 Jinlin Medical College
 Norman Bethune Health Science Center, Jilin University
 Medical College, Yanbian University

Liaoning
 China Medical University (PRC)
 Dalian Medical University
 Faculty of Medicine, Dalian University
 Jinzhou Medical University
 Shenyang Medical College

Ningxia
 Ningxia Medical University

Qinghai 
Medical College, Qinghai University

Sichuan
 West China Medical Center of Sichuan University
 Chengdu Medical College
 North Sichuan Medical College
 Luzhou Medical college
 Chengdu University of Traditional Chinese Medicine

Shaanxi
 The Fourth Military Medical University
 Shaanxi University of Chinese Medicine
 School of Medicine, Xi'an Jiaotong University
 School of Medicine, Yan'an University

Shandong
 Binzhou Medical University
 Jining Medical University
 Medical College, Qingdao University
 Cheeloo College of Medicine, Shandong University
 Taishan Medical University
 Weifang Medical University
 Shandong First Medical University

Shanghai
 Fudan University (Fudan University Shanghai Medical College, formerly Shanghai Medical University)
 Tongji University
 Shanghai University Of Traditional Chinese Medicine
 Shanghai Jiaotong University (School of Medicine, Shanghai Jiao Tong University, formerly Shanghai Second Medical University)
 Shanghai University of Medicine & Health Sciences
 Second Military Medical University

Shanxi 
 Changzhi Medical College
 School of Medicine, Datong University
 Shanxi Medical University

Tianjin
 School of Medicine, Nankai University
 Tianjin Medical University

Tibet 
 Medical College, Tibet University
 School of Medicine, Xizang Minzu University

Xinjiang
 School of Medicine, Shihezi University
 Xinjiang Medical University
 新疆第二医学院

Yunnan
 School of Clinical Medicine, Dali University
 Kunming Medical University
 Kunming University of Science and Technology

Zhejiang
 School of Medicine, Hangzhou Normal University
 School of Medicine & Nursing Science, Huzhou University
 Medical School, Ningbo University
 Medical College, Jiaxing University
 School of Medicine, Shaoxing University
 Medical School, Taizhou University
 Wenzhou Medical University
 Zhejiang University School of Medicine

Independent (or private) colleges 
 Clinical College, Hebei Medical University
 Faculty of Medicine, Shuda College, Hunan Normal University
 Kangda College, Nanjing Medical University
 Faculty of Medicine, Jitang College, North China University of Science and Technology
 Faculty of Medicine, Science & Technology College, Shihezi University
 Clinical Medical College, Tianjin Medical University
 Faculty of Medicine, Zhejiang University City College

Newly-established 
There are several newly established medical schools in mainland China which have not been authorised to confer the MBBS so far, they might be in the next years:
 School of Medicine, South China University of Technology
 School of Medicine, Southwest Jiaotong University
 School of Medicine, University of Electronic Science and Technology of China
 School of Medicine, University of Science and Technology of China

See also
 Medical school
 List of medical schools

References

China
Medical schools